Sebastian Teodorescu (1 June 1880, Prisaca, Olt - 3 July 1940, Bucharest) was a Moldovan politician, mayor of Chișinău between 1926–1927, succeeding Nicolae Bivol and before Gherman Pântea's second term.

Biography 
Sebastian Teodorescu studied at the University of Bucharest, where he obtained his law degree. Later he worked in various positions: chief of police Tulcea, mayor of Tulcea, Dean of Tulcea Bar.

Teodorescu entered the World War I as a lieutenant. His personal file attests the participation in the battles carried out in: Bulgaria, Transylvania, Bucovina, Muntenia and Mărășești.

In 1918 he arrived in Bessarabia with the first detachments of the Romanian army, and after demobilization he settled permanently in Chisinau, resuming his profession of lawyer.

In 1926, when the first administrative elections took place in Bessarabia, Teodorescu applied for the post of mayor of Chișinău and won the elections becoming the first mayor elected after the Union on 27 March 1918.

Honours and awards 
 Order of the Crown of Romania
 Order of the Star of Romania
 Order of Michael the Brave
 National Order of Faithful Service
 Military Virtue Medal

External links 
 Primari ai oraşului Chişinău

Notes

Mayors of Chișinău